Per Pedersen is the name of:
Per Pedersen Tjøstland (formerly Per Pedersen) (1918-2004), Norwegian Nazi activist
Per Pedersen (footballer) (born 1969), Danish footballer
Per Pedersen (cyclist) (born 1964), Danish road racing cyclist